Alberto Pimpini (born January 26, 1997 in Rivoli) is an Italian curler from Giaveno. He currently plays third on Team Luca Rizzolli.

At the national level, he is a 2019 Italian mixed champion.

He started curling in 2007 at the age of 10.

Teams

Men's

Mixed

References

External links

Aviere Scelto Alberto Pimpini - Aeronautica Militare

Living people
1997 births
Italian male curlers
Italian curling champions
Sportspeople from the Metropolitan City of Turin
People from Rivoli, Piedmont